Morens or Moréns is a locality located in the municipality of Beranuy, in Huesca province, Aragon, Spain. As of 2020, it has a population of 0.

Geography 
Morens is located 126km east-northeast of Huesca.

References

Populated places in the Province of Huesca